Utopia is a British thriller drama television series that was broadcast on Channel 4 from 15 January 2013 to 12 August 2014. The show was written by Dennis Kelly and starred Fiona O'Shaughnessy, Adeel Akhtar, Paul Higgins, Nathan Stewart-Jarrett, Alexandra Roach, Oliver Woollford, Alistair Petrie and Neil Maskell. A second six-episode series was commissioned by Channel 4 and went into production in late 2013, and was broadcast in July and August 2014. The show has since gained a cult following.

In October 2014, the series' official Twitter feed stated there would not be a third series. HBO had originally planned to make an American version of the show in 2014, but did not produce it due to budget disputes. Amazon then acquired the rights to the series as of April 2018, and an American version was released on 25 September 2020. Initially nearly inaccessible for viewing on the U.S. market, Amazon released both of the original series on Amazon Prime on 1 November 2020.

Synopsis

A community of comic book fans believe the graphic novel The Utopia Experiments predicted several disastrous epidemics, such as mad cow disease (BSE). A rumoured unpublished sequel supposedly contains further information on future world events. When one Utopia enthusiast procures the manuscript, he invites four of his friends from an online forum to meet in real life. However, after getting their hands on the manuscript, the four – Ian, Becky, Wilson, and Grant – find themselves in over their heads, as a secret organization only known as "The Network" is after it. They find their lives systematically dismantled, while The Network operatives kill anyone in their way as they hunt for the manuscript and someone named Jessica Hyde.

Jessica, who has been on the run from The Network her entire life, meets with the group and helps them evade capture. Meanwhile, other characters find themselves ensnared in The Network's orbit, and through their interactions with its agents, the organization's purpose and secret plot come into focus. The closer people come to understanding what's truly going on, the more dangerous things become. As rumors of "Russian flu" proliferate worldwide and a variety of groups and individuals close in on the protagonists, they try to solve the web of mysteries and conspiracies around them.

Cast

Main
Fiona O'Shaughnessy as Jessica Hyde, a woman who has been on the run from The Network for as long as she can remember. Her father, Philip Carvel, created the Utopia manuscripts. Aine Garvey portrays a young Jessica.
Alexandra Roach as Becky, a post-grad student. Convinced there is a conspiracy surrounding her father's death connected to the Utopia manuscript, she is determined to find out the truth. She suffers from the mysterious "Deel's syndrome," for which she has been taking medication.
Nathan Stewart-Jarrett as Ian Johnson, an IT consultant who still lives with his mother.
Adeel Akhtar as Wilson Wilson, a survivalist conspiracy theorist. He finds his loyalties divided as he learns more about The Network's plans.
Oliver Woollford as Grant Leetham, a troubled 11-year-old boy. Originally pretending to be an adult online, he ends up with the Utopia manuscript. He is later framed for a school shooting and forced to go on the run.
Paul Higgins as Michael Dugdale, a civil servant who finds himself blackmailed by The Network over his affair with a Russian prostitute.
Neil Maskell as Arby/Piètre, a Network agent searching for Jessica Hyde and the Utopia manuscript. He is unstable and emotionally disconnected. Mason and Harley Rooney portray a Young Arby.
Geraldine James as Milner, an MI5 agent whom the group turns to for help. Rose Leslie portrays a younger Milner.

Recurring
Ruth Gemmell as Jen Dugdale, Michael's wife.
Emilia Jones as Alice Ward, a schoolgirl who becomes embroiled in the conspiracy after Grant meets her and hides the Utopia manuscript in her bedroom.
Alistair Petrie as Geoff Lawson, Secretary of State for Health and Michael's boss, an inside man for The Network.
Paul Ready as Lee, Arby's partner. He takes a special delight in interrogation and torture.
Simon McBurney (series 1) and Michael Maloney (series 2) as Christian Donaldson, a scientist whom Michael asks for help.
James Fox as Letts' Assistant (series 1–2). Ed Birch portrays a younger Assistant.
Stephen Rea as Conran Letts (series 1), the acting CEO of Corvadt, a biological sciences company and apparent head of The Network.
Anna Madeley as Anya Levchenko (series 1), a Russian sex worker with whom Michael is having an affair.
Mark Stobbart as Bejan Chervo (series 1), the finder of the Utopia II manuscript who invites Ian, Becky, Grant and Wilson to meet him. Before he can do so, he is murdered by Arby and Lee.
Sylvestra Le Touzel as Leah Gorsand (series 2), CEO of Rochane Foundation, an NGO funding the Russian flu vaccine campaign, underwriting the cost for countries that cannot afford it.
Ian McDiarmid as 'Anton' (series 2), a confused old Romanian who is in fact the scientist Philip Carvel, the long thought dead creator of 'The Utopia Experiments'. Tom Burke portrays a younger Carvel.
Gerard Monaco as Joe (series 1–2), Ian's colleague.

Guest
Michael Smiley as Detective Inspector Joshua Reynolds (series 1), a police officer investigating Bejan's death.
Alan Bentley as Scientist (series 1–2). Ian Porter portrays a younger Scientist.
Eleanor Matsuura as Bev (series 1), Michael's colleague who signs off on the purchase of the Russian flu vaccine.
Anca-Ioana Androne as Brosca (series 2), Philip Carvel's wife.
Emil Hostina as Marius (series 2), a Romanian translator whom Becky, Grant, and Ian use to communicate with Anton/Philip Carvel.
Kevin Eldon as Tony Bradley (series 2), a scientist and author of a book on Deel's Syndrome.
Will Attenborough as Ben (series 2), a member of a hacking collective who assists the main characters.
Juliet Cowan as Bridget (series 2), a scientist colleague of Michael who notices discrepancies in government plans for the Russian flu vaccine.
Sacha Dhawan as Paul Simpson (series 2), a Network sleeper agent.
Steven Robertson as Terrence Truman (series 2), another Network sleeper agent.
David Calder as Dobri Gorski (series 2), Donaldson's former professor who attempted to fake his death to evade The Network.
Dara Ó Briain as himself
Jon Snow as himself

Production
In April 2012, Channel 4 announced that it had commissioned a six-episode drama series titled Utopia. The series was written by Dennis Kelly and produced by Kudos Film and Television.  Marc Munden was chosen as the director, Rebekah Wray-Rogers the producer, and Dennis Kelly, Jane Featherstone and Karen Wilson the executive producers.

Conception and development
Kudos Film and Television approached Kelly with an idea about a conspiracy hidden inside a graphic novel. Kelly liked some of the idea, but some of it he changed. The story involved a shadowy organisation called The Network, and Kelly initially came out with an idea that The Network might be responsible for the rise in conspiracy theories because they thought it would be the best way to hide an actual conspiracy. Kelly said he does not believe in conspiracy theories, but is fascinated by them. The series took about two years to come to fruition.

Post-production
To emulate the graphic novel printing process, Marc Munden chose to use a Technicolor palette: "The three-strip Technicolor process we use is  the opposite colours – yellows, cyan, magentas. I was interested in Doris Day films from the 1950s that pushed those distinct elements." Colourist Aidan Farrell used grading software Nucoda Film Master to paint bolder colours into the shots. By the second series the production crew were preparing the film sets for grading.

Filming locations
Utopia is set in London, but was filmed mostly in Merseyside and Yorkshire between April and October 2012, while the panning shot of the Mercury Hotel in the first episode was filmed in Westhoughton. Producer Bekki Wray-Rogers claimed the reason for this was that no other area in the UK could have provided them with such a variety of locations. Some scenes, such as the office of Conran Letts, were filmed at Scarisbrick Hall near Ormskirk. Scenes for the school shooting in episode 3 were filmed at Alsop High School in Walton whilst the school was closed for summer in July 2012. The empty red sandstone stately home the group make use of from episode 4 is filmed at Woolton Hall. The café scene in the fifth episode is filmed at TC's Cafe & Take-Away on Southport New Road near the village of Mere Brow. Many scenes were filmed in Crosby and Skelmersdale. Scenes set in the office of a fictional newspaper were shot in the offices of the Liverpool Echo newspaper on Old Hall Street in Liverpool. The final scene of the first series, with Jessica and Milner, was shot atop the Cunard Building, one of Liverpool's "three graces".

In the second series, locations used included Barnsley Interchange in Barnsley, Temple Works in Leeds, The Chocolate Works in York, the Yorkshire Dales National Park, the Hepworth Gallery in Wakefield, and various spots in Leeds city centre, which doubled as London by superimposing London landmarks on the horizon. The scene in which Mr Rabbit and Philip Carvel meet was filmed at Allerton Castle near Harrogate. The abandoned building in the second episode of series 2 was shot in the former Terry's Chocolate Factory in York.

Referencing real world events
The TV drama referenced a number of real world events, and incorporated these events into the story of the conspiracy. In the second series, the show used various news footage from the 1970s including the assassinations of Aldo Moro, Carmine Pecorelli, Richard Sykes, and Airey Neave. The TWA Flight 841 disaster is also referenced in this episode. In particular, several events from a 10-day period in 1979, including the Three Mile Island accident and the collapse of the Labour government, had been combined as a jumping off point for the second series.

Cancellation 
Utopia was cancelled by Channel Four on 12 August 2014. The network's official statement was:

Reception
The first series was generally well received by the critics, with some high praise for its striking visuals, but also some expressions of concern about its violence.  Aidan Smith of The Scotsman noted both its "astonishing visuals" as well as its "astonishing violence", while Tom Sutcliffe of The Independent thought it a dystopian fantasy "delivered with great visual style" but was not convinced that its violence is necessary. Mark Monahan of The Daily Telegraph described it as "a dark, tantalizingly mysterious overture", while Sam Wollaston of The Guardian called it "a work of brilliant imagination", "a 21st-century nightmare" that "looks beautiful", but also wondered about the gratuitousness of its violence.

However, Utopia creator and writer Dennis Kelly defended the use of violence in his work, stating:

Controversy
UK media regulator Ofcom received 44 complaints about the television series including complaints about violence, offensive language and child actors being involved in scenes of adult content. Thirty-seven of the complaints related to a scene at the beginning of the third episode where a shooting takes place in a secondary school, a month after the Sandy Hook Elementary School shooting.

In the second series, the use of real life events including the assassination of Airey Neave prompted criticisms of the show by a number of people, including members of the Neave family. In response, Channel 4 issued a statement and said that the drama series is "entirely fictional" and "it is not [Channel 4's] intention to cause offence and Utopia does not suggest that any other real organization was responsible for the death of Airey Neave."

Awards and nominations
In 2014, the series was nominated for and won the International Emmy Award for best drama series.

Release

DVD/Blu-ray

Soundtrack

The series soundtrack was composed by Cristobal Tapia de Veer. The album entitled Utopia (Original Television Soundtrack) was released 7 October 2013, on both CD and MP3 download by Silva Screen Music. In August 2014 a contest was announced on Facebook to create a remix of the "Utopia Overture".
 
Cristobal Tapia De Veer announced via Twitter that the Series 2 soundtrack was coming 8 December. It was then released that day, and is now available on major music streaming services. It is also available for purchase as a CD/DVD, as well as on vinyl.
 "Utopia Overture" (3:32)
 "The Network" (3:21)
 "Dislocated Thumbs (Pt. 1)" (2:17)
 "Mr. Rabbit's Game" (1:05)
 "Conspiracy (Pt. 1)" (2:53)
 "Meditative Chaos" (3:10)
 "A New Brand of Drug" (2:13)
 "Samba De Wilson" (2:15)
 "Slivovitz" (1:43)
 "Bekki on Pills (Pt. 1)" (1:01)
 "Where Is Jessica Hyde? (Pt. 1)" (3:39)
 "Arby's Oratorio" (1:38)
 "Jessica Gets Off" (3:18)
 "Mr. Rabbit It Is" (2:51)
 "Lovechild" (1:03)
 "Mind Vortex" (2:48)
 "Twat" (2:02)
 "Bekki on Pills (Pt. 2)" (3:16)
 "Fertility Control" (1:50)
 "Janus Saves" (2:51)
 "Evil Prevails" (2:55)
 "Conspiracy (Pt. 2)" (4:56)
 "Dislocated Thumbs (Pt. 2)" (1:28)
 "Utopia Descent" (2:42)
 "Where Is Jessica Hyde? (Pt. 2)" (4:08)
 "Utopia's Death Cargo" (1:38)
 "The Experiment" (6:16)
 "Utopia Finale" (2:35)

American adaptation

In February 2014, HBO ordered an American adaptation of Utopia, to be co-created and directed by David Fincher, with Gillian Flynn as the writer. Fincher planned to direct all episodes of the series, and said "I like the characters – I love Dennis’s honesty and affinity for the nerds." In June 2015, it was announced that Rooney Mara was negotiating for the role of Jessica Hyde. On 30 July 2015, it was reported that the series would not go into production because of budget disputes between Fincher and HBO, and that the cast had been released from their contracts. After HBO lost rights to the project, Amazon ordered a nine-episode first season directly on 19 April 2018, with Flynn said to adapt the project from the original.

The American adaptation was released on Amazon Prime Video on 25 September 2020 and was created by Gillian Flynn.

References

External links

 (No longer active)
 
 (No longer available)
Utopia at Kudos Film and Television

2010s British comedy-drama television series
2010s British drama television series
2013 British television series debuts
2014 British television series endings
Biological weapons in popular culture
British thriller television series
Channel 4 original programming
Conspiracy theories in popular culture
English-language television shows
International Emmy Award for Best Drama Series winners
Sterilization in fiction
Television series about viral outbreaks
Television series by Endemol
Television series set in the 1970s
Television shows about comics
Television shows set in England
Television shows set in London
Television shows shot in Liverpool
Overpopulation fiction